Géza Fejér (born 20 April 1945) is a retired Hungarian discus thrower. He won a bronze medal at the 1971 European Championships and finished fifth in the 1972 Summer Olympics.

Híres mondása volt: "-Kokszra koksz, nagyot dobsz!"

References

External links 
 

1945 births
Living people
Hungarian male discus throwers
Olympic athletes of Hungary
Athletes (track and field) at the 1972 Summer Olympics
European Athletics Championships medalists
Athletes from Budapest
20th-century Hungarian people